Acheron Youth Camp, an Australian minimum security training facility for juvenile males, is located in Buxton, Victoria, Australia, approximately  north–east of Melbourne. The facility is operated by Youth Justice Custodial Services, an agency of the Department of Justice of the Victorian Government.

Administered by the Melbourne Youth Justice Centre, the camp focuses on vocational development, rehabilitation and community integration.

Programs and facilities
Young people at Acheron participate in a broad range of work-based activities that are integrated with accredited general education programs and training in building and construction and horticulture (landscape) provided by the Kangan Institute of TAFE. Work activities include building construction, preventative maintenance, clearing, mowing, painting, tree felling, cutting wood and weed spraying. Young people are encouraged to participate in a range of recreational activities, including fishing, bushwalking, horse riding and playing golf.

Young people can be granted weekend leave to their families, depending on their circumstances and their progress in the program.

Health professionals from the Melbourne Youth Justice Centre provide counselling and other personal development programs on an outreach basis.

References

Juvenile detention centres in Australia
Prisons in Victoria (Australia)